The 2019 Kazakhstan Cup was the 28th season of the Kazakhstan Cup, the annual nationwide football cup competition of Kazakhstan since the independence of the country. FC Kaisar defeated FC Atyrau in the final on 6 October 2019 to win their second Kazakhstan Cup.

Participating clubs 
The following 26 teams qualified for the competition:

Group stages

Group A

Group B

Group C

Group D

Last 16

Quarterfinal

Semifinals
The four winners from the quarterfinals were drawn into two two-legged ties.

Final

Scorers

3 goals:

 Alijar Mohammad, Akademiya Ontustik
 Duman Tursynbay, Altai Semey
 Nurzhan Kuanyshkaliev, SDYuShOR 8 
 Bauyrzhan Turysbek, Tobol 

2 goals:

 Boris Fomenkov, Akademiya Ontustik
 Abat Aimbetov, Aktobe
 Vladimir Vyatkin, Altai Semey 
 Erkasym Yeshenkul, Arys
 Said Muzarapov, Igilik
 Tigran Barseghyan, Kaisar
 Ivan Sadownichy, Kaisar
 Bekzhan Abdrahman, Kyran
 Azamat Khasenov, SDYuShOR 8 
 Wildam Nasibullin, SDYuShOR 8 
 Victor Pron, SDYuShOR 8 
 Daulet Yesbergenov, SDYuShOR 8 
 Maxim Fedin, Tobol 
 Azat Nurgaliev, Tobol 

1 goals:

 Vadim Afanasenko, Akademiya Ontustik
 Yerkebulan Amangeldy, Akademiya Ontustik
 Altynbek Daulethanov, Akademiya Ontustik
 Galymzhan Ermurzaev, Akademiya Ontustik
 Kanat Karimolla, Akademiya Ontustik
 Zhandos Kuandykov, Akademiya Ontustik
 Nursultan Taszhanov, Aksu
 Magyar Ramazanov, Aksu
 Amir Muralinov, Aksu
 Valery Lenkov, Aksu
 Hrvoje Miličević, Aktobe
 Daurenbek Tazhimbetov, Akzhayik
 Anuar Umashev, Altai Semey 
 Elyor Samarov, Arys
 Serikzhan Muzhikov, Astana
 Rinat Dzhumatov, Atyrau
 Alexey Rodionov, Atyrau
 Eduard Sergienko, Atyrau
 Piotr Grzelczak, Atyrau
 Ilya Vorotnikov, Caspiy
 Aykhan Kozhabekov, Didara Sıdıkbeka
 Sumit Chulagov, Ekibastuz 
 Islam Nartbayev, Ekibastuz 
 Aslan Yerken, Ekibastuz 
 Shyngys Rysbek, Igilik
 Roger Cañas, Irtysh Pavlodar
 Stanislav Lunin, Irtysh Pavlodar
 Magomed Paragulgov, Irtysh Pavlodar
 Kaspars Dubra, Irtysh Pavlodar
 Samat Sarsenov, Kairat
 Ihar Zyankovich, Kaisar
 Kule Mbombo, Kaisar
 Askhat Tagybergen, Kaisar
 Duman Narzildaev, Kaisar
 Bratislav Punoševac, Kaisar
 Kirill Pasichnik, Kyran
 Nursayin Zholdasov, Kyran
 Danil Choi, Kyzylzhar 
 Viktor Gunchenko, Kyzylzhar 
 Vsevolod Koloda, Kyzylzhar 
 Pavel Kriventsov, Kyzylzhar 
 Elmar Nabiev, Kyzylzhar 
 Uroš Delić, Kyzylzhar 
 Adilet Abdenabi, Makhtaaral
 Beknur Ryskul, Makhtaaral
 Temirlan Erlanov, Ordabasy
 Maxim Vaganov, Ordabasy
 Abdoulaye Diakate, Ordabasy
 Arsen Yelemesov, SDYuShOR 8 
 Gavril Kan, Taraz 
 Serge Nyuiadzi, Taraz 
 Mikhail Gordeichuk, Tobol 
 Artūras Žulpa, Tobol 

Own goal

 Noyan Auganov, Ruzaevka (vs Altai Semey, 19 March 2019)
 Islambek Kuat, Kairat (vs Tobol, 8 May 2019)

References

External links 
 

2019
Cup
2019 domestic association football cups